Crewe Depot may refer to:

Crewe Carriage Sidings
Crewe Diesel TMD
Crewe Electric TMD
Crewe Gresty Lane TMD